The 793d Radar Squadron is an inactive United States Air Force unit. It was last assigned to the 30th Air Division, Aerospace Defense Command, stationed at Hutchinson Air Force Station, Kansas. It was inactivated on 8 September 1968.

The unit was a General Surveillance Radar squadron providing for the air defense of the United States.

Lineage
 Constituted as the 793d Aircraft Control and Warning Squadron
 Activated on 1 May 1951
 Redesignated as 793d Radar Squadron (SAGE) on 1 February 1962
 Discontinued and inactivated on 8 September 1968

Assignments
 546th Aircraft Control and Warning Group, 1 May 1951
 159th Aircraft Control and Warning Group, 4 June 1951
 33d Air Division, 6 February 1952
 20th Air Division, 1 March 1956
 Kansas City Air Defense Sector, 1 January 1960
 Sioux City Air Defense Sector, 1 July 1961
 30th Air Division, 1 April 1966 - 8 September 1968

Stations
 Hutchinson AFS, Kansas, 1 May 1951 - 8 September 1968

See also
 List of United States Air Force aircraft control and warning squadrons

References

External links

Radar squadrons of the United States Air Force
Aerospace Defense Command units